Massimo Tazzer (born 28 May 1999) is an Italian professional footballer who plays as a right back for  club Gubbio.

Club career
Born in Genoa, Tazzer started his career in local club Genoa C.F.C. He played two seasons for the Primavera team. For the 2018–19 season, he was loaned to Serie D club Ponsacco, and Tazzer made his senior debut.

On 24 August 2019, he signed with Serie C club Monopoli. On 19 February 2020, he extended his contract with the club.

On 26 January 2022, he joined Serie C club Gubbio.

References

External links
 
 

1999 births
Living people
Footballers from Genoa
Italian footballers
Association football fullbacks
Serie C players
Serie D players
Genoa C.F.C. players
F.C. Ponsacco 1920 S.S.D. players
S.S. Monopoli 1966 players
A.S. Gubbio 1910 players